Triple Threat is a 2019 action thriller film directed by Jesse V. Johnson and starring Tony Jaa, Iko Uwais and Tiger Chen, as well as Scott Adkins, Michael Jai White, Michael Bisping, Celina Jade, and Jeeja Yanin.

The film was released to generally positive reviews, with critics praising the fight choreography as well as the cast performances, but criticism of the lack of plot and character development.

Plot
Deveraux enlists mercenaries, ex-Thai Special Forces Payu and ex-Chinese Special Forces Long Fei, for a humanitarian mission in Thailand to free prisoners. Unbeknownst to Payu and Long Fei, Deveraux and his crew (Mook, Joey, Steiner and Dom) want to free their leader, Collins, a terrorist. Deveraux and his crew shoot up the village guarded by Indonesian soldiers for hire, waking up Jaka, and killing his wife. During the ensuing chaos, Payu and Jaka fight. Before the victor could be determined, Mook shoots a grenade at Jaka, knocking him out. Deveraux frees Collins — who has been enslaved and sadistically tortured for a long period of time — and Collins kills his captor. Deveraux double crosses Payu and Long Fei to tie up loose ends, knocking them down into a cage. Collins sets a bomb to burn down the evidence. Payu and Long Fei free the prisoners and barely escape. In the aftermath, Jaka wakes up and sees his village in shambles. After burying his wife and the villagers, he swears vengeance against Payu and the people responsible for the destruction of his village.

A few days later, Jaka learns that Payu and Long Fei are participating in an illegal boxing ring in Maha Jaya. After Payu defeats a boxer, Jaka and Long Fei face off. Long Fei beats Jaka, but Payu recognizes him as the villager he fought a few days ago. After healing Jaka and giving him food, Jaka gets them drunk and calls the cops. Payu and Long Fei are arrested and sent to the Central Police Station. A philanthropist named Tian Xiao Xian arrives in Maha Jaya. Xiao Xian plans to donate money to charity to purge the city's corruption. Su Feng orders Collins and his crew to kill her, due to Xiao Xian being an obstacle to Su Feng's criminal activities. As Madame Liang plans takes Xiao Xian to the Chinese Embassy, Collins and his crew arrive and attempt to kill her. In the process many local bodyguards are killed, Madame Liang is injured but not before gunning down Dom and telling Xiao Xian that she must go to the Central Police Station, as that is the only place she will be safe.

Xiao Xian arrives at the police station to get help, but they do not understand her due to language barrier. The police take Long Fei to her and interrogate Payu in another room. Meanwhile, Collins and his crew arrive at the police station after a tip from Jaka. As Payu fights Steiner, Jaka shoots Steiner in the back, allowing Payu to kill Steiner. Jaka reveals that he is on their side and had Payu and Long Fei arrested to draw Collins out. Long Fei fights against Joey and beats him, escaping with Payu and Xiao Xian. Jaka kills Mook by blowing her up with a grenade launcher, then meets up with Collins to ally with him, acting as a mole.

After barely escaping from Collins twice, Payu calls Collins and offers to trade Xiao Xian for $100,000 and his freedom, asking to meet at the old Polo House.  Collins agrees but tells his crew and Jaka to use all their remaining money to hire shooters to kill them instead. Payu goes to his old boss and convinces him to give them weapons. Long Fei and Xiao Xian meet up with Collins and his crew at the location, while Payu swiftly guns down all the shooters. In the ensuing chaos, Long Fei knocks out Joey by smashing a brick on his head and helps Jaka kill Deveraux. After Jaka calls the Chinese ambassador and reveals where Xiao Xian is, he tries to help Payu beat Collins, but he is too much for them. Jaka is kicked off the balcony by Collins.

Collins finds Xiao Xian and tries to shoot her, but Long Fei jumps in, taking the bullet. Payu arrives and finally kills Collins. Joey wakes up and is about to shoot Payu when Xiao Xian kills him. The next day, Su Feng is arrested. Madame Liang finds Xiao Xian and reveals that Jaka was the one who gave them their location. Madame Liang takes Xiao Xian to the Chinese Embassy, and Payu and Long Fei jokingly berate Jaka for nearly getting them all killed.

Cast 

 Tony Jaa as Payu
 Iko Uwais as Jaka
 Tiger Chen as Long Fei 
 Scott Adkins as Collins
 Michael Jai White as Devereaux
 Michael Bisping as Joey
 Celina Jade as Tian Xiao Xian
 Jeeja Yanin as Mook
 Ron Smoorenburg as Steiner
 Dominique Vandenberg as Dom
 Sile Zhang as Jaka's Wife
 Michael Wong as Triad Leader
 Jennifer Qi Jun Yang as Madame Liang
 Monica Mok as Su Feng
 Selina Lo as News Reporter Fei Chen

Release date
The film premiered on February 28, 2019 in China. It had a limited release in theaters for one day only on March 19, 2019 in the United States. It has been released internationally on video on demand and digital on March 22, 2019. It was released theatrically in the United Kingdom on March 29, 2019.

Reception 
The website's consensus reads: "Triple Threat might have made better use of its attention-getting cast, but action fans should still find the end results entertaining enough to rate a rental." Rotten Tomatoes also ranked it at No. 4 on its list of "The Best Action Movies of 2019". On Metacritic the film has a weighted average score of 60 out of 100 based on 4 reviews, indicating "mixed or average reviews".

For Forbes, Scott Mendelson wrote: "That being said, this is still an action movie starring a host of action movie all-stars, and they all get a chance to shine both in terms of character work and butt-kicking." Fred Topel of We Live Entertainment wrote: "You've got Silat vs Kung Fu and Muay Thai. They each get plenty of chances to fight solo too, or to team up against a powerful foe. Triple Threat really explores all the possible combinations of martial arts talent at their disposal."

Amanda Sink of Hollywood Outsider wrote that Triple Threat is explosively fun, ″with some of the best martial arts fight scenes, basic story turned intriguing, and a pronounced cast." Eoin of Action Elite gave the film 4 out of 5 stars wrote: "Overall, Triple Threat is a near perfect blend of fistfights and firepower making it easily the best action movie of the year so far; it has plenty of breakneck action, a cast that is clearly having a ball and one of the highest body counts in years."

Cary Daring of Houston Chronicle wrote: "Triple Threat does not deliver on its kinetic casting promise." Dom Sinacola of Paste Magazine wrote: "Triple Threat fight scenes never as mercilessly satiating as they could get nor its plot as brisk and fatless as it should be. Instead, a muddled narrative about criss-crossing allegiances and noble billionaires and shadowy criminal enterprises."

Nick Harley of Den of Geek wrote: "You'll spend most of the film's running time hoping that this trio gets to work together again in a film worthy of their talents."

References

External links
 
 

2019 action films
2019 martial arts films
2019 films
2010s English-language films
English-language Thai films
English-language Chinese films
Thai-language films
2010s Indonesian-language films
2010s Mandarin-language films
Thai multilingual films
American multilingual films
Thai films about revenge
American films about revenge
Thai martial arts films
American martial arts films
Chinese martial arts films
Chinese multilingual films
Films directed by Jesse V. Johnson
2010s American films